Anthony Addington (1713 – 22 March 1790) was an English physician.

Life
Born in Twyford, Addington was educated at Winchester College. He went up to Trinity College, Oxford, where he took the degree of M.A. on 13 May 1740 and of M.D. on 24 January 1744. He was subsequently admitted a fellow of the College of Physicians, and went into practice in London, but was compelled by bad health to move to the country. His career gained considerable public attention when he appeared as an expert for the prosecution of Mary Blandy for the poisoning of her father Francis Blandy in 1752. He then retired to Reading in Berkshire, where he derived a large income from his profession, until his death in 1790. He devoted his attention particularly to the treatment of insanity, and was one of the physicians called in to see George III when he first showed symptoms of mental aberration.

Addington was a confidential friend and adviser of Lord Chatham. He took part in unsuccessful negotiations of a coalition between Chatham and Lord Bute.

Works
Addington wrote An Essay on the Sea Scurvy, wherein is proposed an easy method of curing that distemper at sea, and of preserving water sweet for any cruise or voyage. Reading, 1753. In this work, he describes the disease from accounts of others, rather than from his own observation. As treatment he recommended depletion, with the employment of seawater as a purgative, and drinks acidulated with muriatic acid. He conceives meat to be injurious, but regards biscuit as food suitable to persons affected with scurvy. He asserted that the addition of an ounce and a half of muriatic acid to a tun of water, will prevent its putrefaction, and preserve it sweet for any length of time.

An authentic Account of the Part taken by the late Earl Chatham in a Transaction which passed in the beginning of the year 1778 is no longer attributed to Addington.

Family
Addington married in 1745, Mary, daughter of the Rev. Haviland John Hiley, headmaster of Reading grammar school. Henry Addington, 1st Viscount Sidmouth, Prime Minister of the United Kingdom from 1801 to 1804, was their eldest son. John Hiley Addington was the second son.

Anne, the eldest, married in 1770 William Goodenough M.D., who died that year.
Eleanor, the second, married James Sutton (died 1801) of Devizes.
Elizabeth married William Hoskins.
Charlotte, the youngest, married in 1788 Charles Bragge Bathurst.

References
Long, George. The Biographical Dictionary of the Society for the Diffusion of Useful Knowledge. London: Longman, Brown, Green & Longmans, 1842–1844. 4 vols.

Notes

1713 births
1790 deaths
People from Twyford, Berkshire
People from Reading, Berkshire
18th-century English medical doctors
People educated at Winchester College
Alumni of Trinity College, Oxford
Parents of prime ministers of the United Kingdom